Antonio Campilongo (born November 18, 1911) was an Argentine professional football player.

He played one season (1939/40, 10 games, 2 goals) in the Serie A for A.S. Roma. He also held Italian citizenship.

External links

1911 births
Year of death missing
Argentine footballers
Club Atlético Platense footballers
Serie A players
A.S. Roma players
Association football midfielders
Footballers from Buenos Aires